Canh's gecko (Gekko canhi) is a species of lizard in the family Gekkonidae. The species is endemic to Vietnam.

Etymology
The specific name, canhi, is in honor of Vietnamese ecologist Le Xuan Canh.

Geographic range
G. canhi is found in Lang Son Province and Lao Cai Province, in northern Vietnam.

Habitat

Description
Medium-sized for its genus, the snout-to-vent length of an adult G. canhi does not exceed .

References

Further reading
Rösler H, Nguyen TQ, Doan KV, Ho CT, Nguyen TT, Ziegler T (2010). "A new species of the genus Gekko Laurenti (Squamata: Sauria: Gekkonidae) from Vietnam with remarks on G. japonicus (Schlegel)". Zootaxa 2329: 56–68. (Gekko canhi, new species).

Gekko
Reptiles described in 2010
Reptiles of Vietnam